The 1972–73 British Home Championship international Home Nations football tournament was, like its predecessor in 1972, a victim of The Troubles in Northern Ireland which had erupted following Bloody Sunday the previous year. As with the previous year in the rugby union 1972 Five Nations Championship, threats were made by Republican activists against visiting British teams, which in this year meant England and Wales. To prevent violence but keep the tournament running, Northern Ireland's "home" games were transferred to Goodison Park, the home of Everton F.C. in Liverpool in England. This step meant that Ireland played just a short ferry ride from Belfast (where the match was originally scheduled) in a city with a substantial Irish population, but where the police were able to exercise a greater measure of control over who was able to attend.

The shift to England did not substantially hinder the Irish, who claimed a rare and respectable second place behind England, who achieved yet another whitewash of their near neighbours. Beating the Irish in Liverpool to match Scotland's win over Wales, England then inflicted defeat on the same team at Wembley, whilst the Irish recovered from their first game to beat the Scots in Scotland. In the final two games, Northern Ireland beat Wales, setting up a close encounter in the final game, in which the winner would take the tournament but a draw would benefit the Irish. The game was a close encounter, made more interesting by an English 5–0 thrashing of Scotland two months earlier in a testimonial match celebrating one hundred years of international football. England however, eventually triumphed by a single goal from Martin Peters, winning the trophy for another year.

Table

Results

References

External links
Full Results and Line-ups

1973
1973 in the United Kingdom
1972–73 in Northern Ireland association football
1972–73 in English football
1972–73 in Welsh football
1972–73 in Scottish football